The American Revolution: Written in Scriptural, or, Ancient Historical Style is a 1796 account of the American Revolution written by Richard Snowden (1753–1825).

Overview

Despite adopting the "scriptural" style, the work is relatively devoid of religious material. The work was aimed at schoolchildren, with Snowden writing that the style was chosen as the style "most suitable to the capacities of young people".  The work was published with verse numbers and uses English of the Jacobean Era, similar to that found in the King James Version of the Bible published in 1611.

In the work, modern place names are replaced with archaic-sounding names, e.g. France is called Gaul.

References

External links
 Read The American Revolution at the Internet Archive.

1796 non-fiction books
18th-century history books
History books about the American Revolution
Works in the style of the King James Version